Troilus is a legendary Trojan whose fate is linked to that of Troy in the Trojan War. 

Troilus may also refer to:
Troilus of Elis (4th century BC), Greek athlete
Troilus (philosopher), a sophist of the 4-5th century in Constantinople
USS Troilus (AKA-46), an Artemis class attack cargo ship
Troilus (bug), a genus of bugs in the family Pentatomidae
1208 Troilus, an asteroid
Lake Troilus, a lake in Quebec
 Troilus and Cressida, a play by William Shakespeare